Saturday Night with Mr. C was Perry Como's third RCA Victor 12" long-play album, and his first recorded in  stereophonic sound. The album is structured as an extended version of the request section of his popular television show, beginning and ending with his theme songs "Dream Along With Me" and "You Are Never Far Away" and with his TV request theme, "We Get Letters" used twice in the album as an intro. At the time, Perry was seen on NBC's Saturday night schedule at 8 P.M. Eastern Time.

All stereo pressings of Saturday Night With Mr. C. excluded the track "Come Rain or Come Shine", despite that song having its title clearly printed on the jacket. It is assumed that this cut had something to do with space limitations within the new stereo LP format; with a playing time of nearly 50 minutes, the album was nearly twice as long as the typical pop LP of the period.  "Come Rain or Come Shine" was reissued in 1967 on the RCA Camden compilation Hello, Young Lovers, but the stereo version on that album was electronically reprocessed ("fake stereo") from monophonic. In 2001, Saturday Night with Mr.C was reissued on compact disc by the Collectables Records third-party reissue label by arrangement with RCA; this reissue included the first release of the true stereo version of "Come Rain or Come Shine".

Since Como's television show ran on Thursday evenings in Australia, the title for the Australian pressing of this album is Thursday Night With Mr. Como. In the United Kingdom, the album was called Dear Perry and spent five weeks in the Melody Maker album chart Top 10, entering on 8 November 1958 and peaking at number 6.

Background accompaniment is provided by the Mitchell Ayres orchestra, with the Ray Charles Singers and arrangements done by Joe Lipman. Cover art by Victor Kalin.

Track listing
Side one
"Opening Theme: Dream Along With Me Time" (Words and Music by Carl Sigman) / "Accentuate the Positive" (Music by Harold Arlen with lyrics by Johnny Mercer)
"It Could Happen To You" (Music by Jimmy Van Heusen with lyrics by Johnny Burke)
"Love Letters" (Music by Victor Young and lyrics by Edward Heyman)
"Almost Like Being In Love" (Music by Frederick Loewe and lyrics by Alan Jay Lerner) / Little Man, You've Had A Busy Day" (Music by Mabel Wayne, Maurice Sigler and Al Hoffman) / "The Gypsy In My Soul" (Music by Clay Boland and lyrics by Moe Jaffe) / "The Whiffenpoof Song" (Music by Tod B. Galloway and Meade Minnigerode with George S. Pomeroy)
"Between the Devil and the Deep Blue Sea" (Music by Harold Arlen and lyrics by Ted Koehler)
"Red Sails in the Sunset" (Music by Hugh Williams (Will Grosz) and lyrics by Jimmy Kennedy)

Side two
"The Birth of the Blues" (Music by Ray Henderson with lyrics by B.G. DeSylva and Lew Brown)
"When I Fall in Love" (Music by Victor Young and lyrics by Edward Heyman)
"Come Rain or Come Shine" (Music by Harold Arlen with lyrics by Johnny Mercer)
"You Made Me Love You" (Music by James V. Monaco and lyrics by Joseph McCarthy) / "I May Be Wrong" (Music by Harry Sullivan and lyrics by Harry Ruskin) / "Like Someone in Love" (Music by Jimmy Van Heusen with lyrics by Johnny Burke) / "Vaya Con Dios" (Words and Music by Larry Russell, Buddy Pepper and Inez James)
"It Had to Be You" (Music by Isham Jones and lyrics by Gus Kahn)
"Twilight on the Trail" (Music by Louis Alter and lyrics by Sidney D. Mitchell) / "Closing Theme: You Are Never Far Away Time" (Music by Robert Allen and lyrics by Allan Roberts)

References

External links
Perry Como Discography

Perry Como albums
1958 albums
RCA Victor albums